Zelše (in older sources also Želše) is a village along the road linking Cerknica and Postojna, at the northwestern part of the karst Cerknica Polje in the Inner Carniola region of Slovenia. Zelše Caves—the source of Rak Creek, a sinking stream—lies west of the village. Big Karlovica Cave, receiving the waters of Stržen Creek, lies southwest of the village. Industrial facilities are located east of the village.

Church

The local church, built on a small hill south of the village, is dedicated to Saint Wolfgang and belongs to the Parish of Cerknica. This Renaissance church was built around 1680 with a triple rounded apse, unique in the region. The Baroque-style belfry was added in 1732. The church has excellent acoustics and is sometimes used as a venue for various concerts.

References

External links

Zelše on Geopedia

Populated places in the Municipality of Cerknica